Major General Douglas Edward Cayley,  (15 July 1870 – 19 December 1951) was a British Army officer of the First World War who played an important part in the evacuation of soldiers from Gallipoli.

Family
Douglas Edward Cayley was a son of Henry Cayley, who served as a medical officer in the British army in India. Among his siblings were Major General Sir Walter de Sausmarez Cayley (1863–1952) and Rear Admiral Henry Priaulx Cayley (1877–1942).

His son Richard Douglas Cayley (1907–1943) was a distinguished submarine officer during the Second World War.

Personal life
Douglas Edward Cayley was born in India, where his father was serving, on 15 July 1870. He was educated at Clifton College and the Royal Military College, Sandhurst.

In 1906 he married Jessie Eyre Duff Gibbon, daughter of Sir William Duff Gibbon, a tea planter in Ceylon.

Military career
Cayley enlisted in the Worcestershire Regiment as a second lieutenant on 1 March 1890. He was promoted to lieutenant on 20 February 1892, and to captain on 24 June 1899. He served in the 1st battalion, which left for South Africa on board the Braemar Castle in March 1900 to serve in the Second Boer War. The battalion was based at Ladybrand. For his service he received the Queen's medal with three clasps and the King's medal with two clasps.

In 1904 he was promoted to major, and in 1914 to lieutenant colonel commanding the 4th Battalion Worcestershire Regiment. He was one of the few officers who served throughout the Gallipoli Campaign. In July 1916 he was in command of the 88th Infantry Brigade when the Battle of the Somme commenced. The following year he was gassed during fighting near Monchy-le-Preux. He was gassed again in the Battle of Passchendaele. In March 1918 he was given command of the 29th Infantry Division with the rank of major general. That year he was made a Companion of the Order of the Bath. For his army service during the First World War he was awarded the Order of the White Eagle of Serbia (3rd class with swords), the Croix de Guerre of France and Belgium and the Order of the Crown of Belgium.

Later life
Cayley retired from the army in 1920 and settled in Hampshire.

During the Second World War he was senior air raid warden for the Yateley district. In 1947 he became a Life Governor of Clifton College. He died at Aldershot, Hampshire on 19 December 1951.

References

Bibliography

Douglas Edward
1870 births
1951 deaths
People educated at Clifton College
Graduates of the Royal Military College, Sandhurst
Companions of the Order of the Bath
Companions of the Order of St Michael and St George
Worcestershire Regiment officers
Gallipoli campaign
British Army personnel of the Second Boer War
British Army generals of World War I
British Army major generals
Military personnel of British India